"Bella Vita" is a song by Swiss DJ and producer DJ Antoine taken from his studio album Sky Is the Limit.  "Bella vita" means beautiful life in Italian.

Track listings

Charts and certifications

Peak positions

Year-end charts

See also
2013 in music

References 

2013 songs
2013 singles
Songs written by Jenson Vaughan